Emperor Wen of Liu Song ((劉)宋文帝, (Liu) Song Wen-di) (407 – 16 March 453), personal name Liu Yilong (劉義隆), childhood name Che'er (車兒), was an emperor of the Liu Song dynasty of China. He was the third son of the dynastic founder Emperor Wu (Liu Yu). After his father's death in 422, Liu Yilong's eldest brother Liu Yifu took the throne as Emperor Shao. In 424, a group of officials, believing Emperor Shao to be unfit to be emperor, deposed Emperor Shao and placed Liu Yilong on the throne as Emperor Wen.

In his 29 years of rule, Emperor Wen largely continued the grand plan of his father and some of the land policies of the Jin Dynasty. The period, called the "Yuanjia administration", is seen as a period of prosperity and strength, because of the emperor's diligence and ability to find capable and honest officials to serve in his administration.  However, Emperor Wen was faulted for making repeated failed attempts to attack rival Northern Wei and using the wrong strategies in doing so, weakening his state toward the end of his rule.  In 453, angry that his crown prince Liu Shao was using witchcraft to curse him, he planned to depose Liu Shao; when this plan was leaked, Liu Shao staged a coup and assassinated him, replacing him on the throne, although less than a year later Liu Shao's younger brother Liu Jun defeated him and took the throne as Emperor Xiaowu.

Early life
Liu Yilong was born at Jingkou (京口, in modern Zhenjiang, Jiangsu) in 407, to Liu Yu and his concubine Hu Dao'an, as Liu Yu's third son; at that time, Liu Yu was already the paramount general for Jin, and so Liu Yilong was born into a household of power and wealth.  For reasons lost to history, Liu Yu put Consort Hu to death in 409.  Liu Yilong's maternal grandmother Lady Su was involved in his upbringing, and he was particularly close to her as he grew up.  In 410, while the Jin capital Jiankang was under attack by the warlord Lu Xun, Liu Yu had his assistant Liu Cui accompany the three-year-old Liu Yilong to serve as the defender of Jingkou.  In 415, he was created the Duke of Pengcheng.  In 417, while Liu Yu was attacking Later Qin, he had Liu Yilong, again assisted by his staff, remain at Pengcheng to serve as the governor of Xu Province (徐州, modern northern Jiangsu and Anhui), to guard his rear.  In 418, after Liu Yu conquered Later Qin, Liu Yilong was made the governor of the important Jing Province (荊州, modern Hubei and Hunan), and commander of armed forces of the western empire.  Those who served on his staff included Dao Yanzhi, Zhang Shao, Wang Tanshou, Wang Hua, and Shen Linzi, with Zhang actually in charge of headquarters due to Liu Yilong's young age.  After Liu Yu seized the Jin throne in 420, establishing Liu Song (as Emperor Wu), he created a number of his sons princes, and Liu Yilong was created the Prince of Yidu at that time.  Around this time, he became known as studious in the Confucian classics and histories, and was also a good calligrapher.

In 424, believing Liu Yilong's older brother Emperor Shao (who had succeeded Emperor Wu after Emperor Wu's death in 422) to be frivolous and incapable of governing the empire, the high-level officials Xu Xianzhi, Fu Liang, and Xie Hui deposed and subsequently killed him, as well as another older brother of Liu Yilong's, Liu Yizhen the Prince of Luling, since they believed Liu Yizhen to be even less suitable than Emperor Shao.  Believing Liu Yilong to be capable and lenient, they offered the throne to Liu Yilong, with Fu personally arriving with other officials at Liu Yilong's headquarters at Jiangling.  Liu Yilong's associates, hearing of Emperor Shao's and Liu Yizhen's deaths, were largely suspicious and suggested that he not head east to the capital Jiankang to accept the throne.  However, Wang Hua pointed out that the coup leaders were in a collective leadership, and the balance of power ensured that they could not commit treason.  Wang Tanshou and Dao also agreed, and Liu Yilong decided to accept the throne, taking the throne later that year as Emperor Wen.

Early reign
Initially, Emperor Wen pacified the high-level officials who were involved in deposing Emperor Shao (including not only Xu Xianzhi, Fu Liang, Xie Hui, but also Wang Tanshou's brother Wang Hong and Tan Daoji) by leaving them in power and further giving them higher offices.  Indeed, he initially left most affairs of state in the hands of Xu and Fu, but gradually acquainted himself in those matters.  He also hinted at disapproval of their actions by recalling the wives and mothers of Emperor Shao and Liu Yizhen to the capital and treating them with honor.  He posthumously honored his mother Consort Hu as an empress dowager, and created his wife Princess Yuan Qigui as empress.

In 425, Xu and Fu offered to resign, and Emperor Wen approved and began to handle important matters of state himself.  However, Xu's nephew Xu Peizhi and his associates Cheng and Wang Shaozhi persuaded him to reconsider, and thereafter he reassumed his post.  (While it was not explicitly stated in history, it appeared that Fu then did so as well.)  However, Emperor Wen was resentful that Xu, Fu, and Xie had killed his two older brothers, and in late 425 planned to destroy them, particularly at the urging of Wang Hua and the general Kong Ningzi.  He therefore mobilized troops and publicly declared that he was going to attack rival Northern Wei, but was privately preparing to arrest Xu and Fu while engaging in a military campaign against Xie, then the governor of Jing Province.  In spring 426, rumors had leaked of such a plan, and so Xie began to prepare for armed resistance.  Soon, Emperor Wen publicly issued an edict ordering that Xu, Fu, and Xie be arrested and killed, while issuing a separate edict summoning Xu and Fu to the palace.

Believing that Wang Hong and Tan had not been involved initially in the plot against Emperor Shao, he recalled them to the capital, and put Tan in charge of the army against Xie and Wang Hong in charge of the imperial government.  Meanwhile, Xie Hui publicly mourned Xu and Fu and declared that all they did was for the empire, blaming Wang Hong, Wang Tanshou, and Wang Hua for falsely accusing them, and demanding their execution.  Xie Hui had a powerful army, but while he thought that several other provincial governors would join him, they refused.  He was initially able to defeat Dao's army, but soon Tan arrived, and Xie, fearful of Tan, did not know what to do.  Tan quickly attacked him and defeated his fleet, and Xie fled back to Jiangling, and then fled with his brother Xie Dun, but Xie Dun was so overweight that he could not ride a horse, and so they slowed down and were captured.  He was then delivered to Jiankang and executed with Xie Jiao and Xie Dun, along with all of his nephews and major associates, although many of his associates were spared.

Emperor Wen became quickly known for his diligence in governing the state and his frugality, as well as his caring for the welfare of the people.  He set up a system where officials, both at the capital and in provinces, were given relatively long office terms, but carefully monitored for their progress.  He was particularly attentive to his brothers' ability to govern, offering them much advice while carefully fostering proper experience for them.  One of them, Liu Yikang the Prince of Pengcheng, soon became known for his skills at governing Jing Province after replacing Xie, and in 428, Wang Hong, who was fearful of drawing attacks for having been prime minister for too long, offered to resign and give his authority to Liu Yikang.  Emperor Wen declined at this point, but did transfer most of Wang Hong's authorities to Liu Yikang in 429.  Also in 429, Emperor Wen created his oldest son by Empress Yuan, Liu Shao, crown prince.  That year, Emperor Wen's maternal grandmother Lady Su died, and he mourned her greatly, wanting to posthumously create her titles, but because of opposition by the key official Yin Jingren, he did not do so.

Around this time, Emperor Wen also started preparing for a campaign against rival Northern Wei, seeking to recover several provinces lost to Northern Wei during the reign of Emperor Shao.  In spring 430, he put Dao Yanzhi in command of a 50,000-man army to attack Northern Wei.  Emperor Taiwu of Northern Wei, when informed by Emperor Wen's messengers that all Emperor Wen was interested in was to recover the provinces south of the Yellow River, retorted angrily that he would withdraw but return in the winter once the Yellow River froze, and that was what he initially did—withdrawing his armies south of the Yellow River to areas north, allowing Liu Song to recover the four key cities of Luoyang, Hulao, Huatai (滑台, in modern Anyang, Hunan), and Qiao'ao (碻磝, in modern Liaocheng, Shandong) without a fight.  Instead of advancing further north into Northern Wei proper, however, Emperor Wen stopped and placed his troops along the Yellow River, even though he had entered into an alliance with Xia's emperor Helian Ding to conquer and divide Northern Wei.  With Emperor Wen's forces immobile, Northern Wei was able to attack Helian Ding and greatly damage Xia (eventually leading to its destruction in 431) absence. Afterwards, Northern Wei prepared to attack the south.  In winter 430, Emperor Wen's general Du Ji, unable to defend Luoyang, abandoned it.  Hulao soon also fell.  Upon hearing this, Dao retreated, leaving the general Zhu Xiuzhi defending Huatai alone.  In spring 431, Emperor Wen sent Tan north to try to relieve Zhu at Huatai, but with Northern Wei forces cutting Tan's supply route off, Tan was unable to reach Huatai and forced to withdraw as well.  Zhu, without support, was soon captured when Huatai fell.  Emperor Wen's first attempt to regain the provinces south of the Yellow River had resulted in failure.

In 432, Wang Hong died, and Liu Yikang was, alone, prime minister after that point.

Also in 432, angry over the misgovernance of Liu Daoji the governor of Yi Province (modern Sichuan and Chongqing), the people of Yi Province rose, under the command of Xu Muzhi, who changed his name to Sima Feilong and claimed to be a descendant of the Jin imperial clan.  Liu quickly defeated and killed Sima Feilong, but the Buddhist monk Cheng Daoyang soon rose in succession and claimed to be the real Sima Feilong, threatening Chengdu the capital of Yi Province, and while the general Pei Fangming was able to repel the siege, Cheng remained a threat for several years, carrying the title of the Prince of Shu.  While the campaign was ongoing, Yang Nandang the ruler of Chouchi, who had been a nominal vassal to both Liu Song and Northern Wei, also attacked and occupied Liang Province (梁州, modern southern Shaanxi) in 433.

Middle reign
In spring 434, Emperor Wen's general Xiao Sihua was able to defeat Yang Nandang's forces and recapture Liang Province.  Yang Nandang soon apologized, and not willing to lose a potential ally against Northern Wei, Emperor Wen accepted his apology.

In 435, Feng Hong the emperor of Northern Yan, under constant Northern Wei attack, offered to be a vassal to Liu Song to try to obtain assistance, and Emperor Wen created Feng Hong the Prince of Yan.  However, Emperor Wen was unable to provide actual assistance, and Feng Hong evacuated his state and fled to Goguryeo in 436.

Around that time, a severe political infighting began to develop within Emperor Wen's administration.  Jealous of Emperor Wen's bestowing of great powers to Yin Jingren, Liu Zhan became to try to defame Yin Jingren, and he ingratiated himself with Liu Yikang to try to use the prime minister's powers to expel Yin from government.  Yin, not willing to fight Liu Zhan, offered to resign under the excuse he was ill, and while Emperor Wen refused, he permitted Yin to take an extended sick leave.  The imperial government, however, became divided into a Liu Zhan-led pro-Liu Yikang faction and an anti-Liu Yikang faction.

In 436, Emperor Wen grew extremely ill.  In his illness, Liu Zhan persuaded Liu Yikang that if Emperor Wen died, no one would be able to control Tan Daoji, and therefore recalled Tan to the capital from his post at Jiang Province (江州, modern Jiangxi and Fujian).  After Tan arrived at Jiankang, Emperor Wen became better in his conditions and was ready to return Tan to his post, when he suddenly turned ill again.  At that time, Tan was already on the dock ready to depart for Jiang Province, and Liu Yikang summoned him back to Jiankang and arrested him. Emperor Wen then issued an edict falsely accusing Tan of preparing treason and executed him with his sons, but spared his grandsons.  (When Tan was arrested, he angrily threw his scarf on the ground and stated bitterly, "You have destroyed your Great Wall." When Northern Wei officials heard of Tan's death, they celebrated.  The traditional account appeared to minimize Emperor Wen's involvement in Tan's death, but subsequent events appear to show that Liu Yikang acted with Emperor Wen's full approval in this matter.)

In spring 437, Emperor Wen seriously considered the proposal that Northern Wei's Emperor Taiwu had made, initially in 431 and then in 433, that the two imperial clans enter into a marital relationship—specifically, to marry one of his daughters to Emperor Taiwu's crown prince Tuoba Huang, and he sent his official Liu Xibo to Northern Wei to negotiate the terms of the marriage.  However, soon thereafter, the daughter who was to marry Tuoba Huang died, and the proposal died with her.

Later in 437, the long-term rebel Cheng Daoyang the Prince of Shu was finally captured and killed, ending a seven-year rebellion.

In 438, Emperor Wen built a university to encourage students to study famous works.  He set up four disciplines at the university:

 Mysticism, taught by the official He Shangzhi
 History, taught by the official He Chengtian
 Literature, taught by the official Xie Yuan
 Confucianism, taught by the hermit Lei Cizong

The historian Sima Guang, author of Zizhi Tongjian, made the following commentary about Emperor Wen with regard to the status of his state at this time:

Emperor Wen's attention to imperial officials' abilities could be seen partly in 439, when, according to an edict that Emperor Wu had left that his sons were to serve as the governor of Jing Province in rotation by age, he was supposed to make his brother Liu Yixuan the Prince of Nanqiao the governor of Jing Province.  However, because he believed Liu Yixuan to be incompetent, he refused, skipping him and giving the post to the more capable brother Liu Yiji the Prince of Hengyang, the governor of Jing Province.  (Several years later, after Liu Yiji's death, and with much urging from his older sister Liu Xingdi the Princess Kuaiji, he finally did make Liu Yixuan the governor of Jing Province, but only after much advice on how to properly govern the province.)

By 440, however, Liu Yikang, a major part of the success of Emperor Wen's government due to his diligence and abilities, had become so flattered by Liu Zhan that he appeared to blur the distinction between himself, as a subject, and the emperor.  When Emperor Wen grew ill again, Liu Zhan and Liu Yikang's associates Liu Bin, Wang Lü, Liu Jingwen, and Kong Yinxiu secretly plotted to have Liu Yikang succeed Emperor Wen, against Emperor Wen's wishes to have Crown Prince Shao be emperor and Liu Yikang serve as regent.  When Emperor Wen grew better, he began to suspect Liu Yikang of wanting to usurp the throne.  In winter 440, he put Liu Yikang under house arrest, while arresting and executing Liu Zhan and a number of other associates of Liu Yikang.  He then removed Liu Yikang from his prime minister post and made him the governor of Jiang Province, while restoring Yin Jingren to power.  He replaced Liu Yikang with another younger brother, Liu Yigong the Prince of Jiangxia, but Liu Yigong, realizing the danger in wielding too much power, did not involve himself much in actual decision-making.  Later that year, Yin Jingren died, and the important responsibilities became split between several officials.

In 441, Yang Nandang, not willing to give up his grandiose designs on Liang and Yi Provinces, attacked Liu Song.  Emperor Wen sent Pei Fangming and another general, Liu Zhendao, to attack Chouchi, and in the only instance at which a southern dynasty army occupied Chouchi, took it over in 442, forcing Yang Nandang to flee to Northern Wei.  However, by 443, Chouchi had fallen to Northern Wei forces, and Pei and Liu Zhendao were executed for having embezzled treasures and horses from Chouchi during the 441 to 442 campaign.

Late reign
In 445, in a famous incident, while waiting to send his brother Liu Yiji off to his new post as governor of Southern Yan Province (南兗州, modern central Jiangsu), Emperor Wen ordered his sons not to eat until dinner is served at the sendoff, but then intentionally had dinner served late, so that his sons would suffer from hunger, and then telling them, "You grew up in a rich household and do not see the people being poor.  I intended that you understand the pain from hunger so that you would learn to be frugal and caring for the people."  However, while this incident general drew praise from historians, some historians, including Pei Ziye, a commentator to the Song Shu, found it hypocritical in that he was putting his sons in high offices at young ages without being properly trained.

After that feast, an alleged plot involving the official (and compiler of Book of the Later Han) Fan Ye was exposed—as it was alleged that Fan had plotted with his nephew Xie Zong and the deposed prime minister Li Yikang's associate Kong Xixian to assassinate Emperor Wen at the feast for Liu Yiji and then making Liu Yikang emperor.  One of the coconspirators, Emperor Wen's nephew Xu Danzhi, after the assassination failed to occur at the feast, informed on his co-conspirators, and other than Xu, the conspirators were all executed.  (The historian Wang Mingsheng found the alleged plot far-fetched, and believed instead that Fan had been the victim of false accusations by Xu, Yu Bingzhi, and He Shangzhi.)  In the aftermaths of the plot, Liu Yikang, whose connection to the plot appeared tenuous at best, was stripped of his title, demoted to commoner rank, and put under house arrest. There would be repeated plots by others to put Liu Yikang on the throne, and by 451, fearful that such a plot would again develop during the midst of a Northern Wei invasion, Emperor Wen would, against promises he made to his older sister Liu Xingdi the Princess Kuaiji, have Liu Yikang killed.

In 446, when Northern Wei was facing a rebellion from the ethnically-Xiongnu Gai Wu, Emperor Wen commissioned Gai as a duke and a general, although he provided no actual military support for Gai.  This, however, aggravated Northern Wei's Emperor Taiwu, and after Emperor Taiwu put down Gai's rebellion, the relationship between the two states turned sour, particularly in light of a horrific raid that Northern Wei troops carried out against Liu Song's Qing (青州, modern central and eastern Shandong), Ji (冀州, modern northwestern Shandong), and Yan (兗州, modern western Shandong) Provinces later that year.

By 449, Emperor Wen was preparing a second campaign to recover the provinces south of the Yellow River, and many generals and officials, in response, submitted battle plans, and the general Wang Xuanmo submitted plans that Emperor Wen particularly liked.  In preparation, Emperor Wen moved the troops stationed and supplies stored in the internal provinces to the boundary provinces.  Meanwhile, however, before he could launch the campaign, Northern Wei's Emperor Taiwu invaded first in spring 450, putting Xuanhu (懸瓠, in modern Zhumadian, Henan) under siege for 42 days, and after much loss on both sides, Emperor Taiwu withdrew without having captured Xuanhu.  This made Emperor Wen believe that Northern Wei's military power was waning, and he decided to launch his attack late in 450, despite oppositions by the generals Liu Kangzu, who believed that the campaign should begin in spring 451, Shen Qingzhi, who opined that Liu Song was not in shape to fight a war against Northern Wei, Xiao Sihua, and Crown Prince Shao.

The Liu Song forces, under the commands of Xiao Bin and Wang Xuanmo, quickly took Qiao'ao and Le'an (樂安, in modern Tangshan, Hebei), as Northern Wei forces abandoned those two cities quickly, and then put Huatai under siege.  The Han people around Huatai were initially gladly supporting the Liu Song campaign, but Wang ordered them to submit a large number of pears, causing them to be angry and turn against Liu Song.  Liu Song forces, as a consequence, could not capture Huatai quickly, and in winter 450, Emperor Taiwu crossed the Yellow River, and Wang's forces collapsed, forcing him to flee back to Qiao'ao.  Xiao considered defending Qiao'ao against the coming Northern Wei assault, but Shen persuaded him that doing so was futile, and despite orders from Emperor Wen to defend Qiao'ao, Xiao led the main forces back to Licheng (歷城, in modern Jinan, Shandong) to preserve the strength of the army.  Meanwhile, due to Wang's defeat at Huatai, although the general Liu Wenjing was able to capture Tong Pass in the west and threaten Northern Wei's Guanzhong region, Emperor Wen chose to recall Liu and abandon the western advances as well.

In retaliation for the Liu Song attack, Emperor Taiwu launched an all-out attack against Liu Song's northern provinces.  Emperor Taiwu's nephew Tuoba Ren quickly captured Xuanhu and Xiangcheng (項城, in modern Zhoukou, Henan) and pillaging his way to Shouyang.  Emperor Taiwu himself advanced on Pengcheng, but did not put that heavily fortified city under siege; rather, he advanced south, claiming that he would cross the Yangtze River and destroy the Liu Song capital Jiankang.  Both his main army and the other branch armies that he sent out carried out heavy slaughters and arsons, laying Liu Song's Huai River region to waste.  Around the new year 451, Emperor Taiwu had reached Guabu (瓜步, in modern Nanjing, Jiangsu), across the river from Jiankang, but at this point he reproposed the marriage-peace proposal he made earlier—that if Emperor Wen married a daughter to one of his grandsons, he would be willing to marry a daughter to Emperor Wen's son, Liu Jun (who was then defending Pengcheng), to establish long-term peace.  Crown Prince Shao favored the proposal, but Jiang Dan opposed, and the marital proposal was not accepted.  In spring 451, worried that his forces were being overstretched and would be attacked in the rear by the Liu Song forces garrisoned at Pengcheng and Shouyang, Emperor Taiwu began a withdraw, and on the way, insulted by the Liu Song general Zang Zhi, he put Xuyi (盱眙, in modern Huai'an, Jiangsu) under siege, and, after both sides suffered heavy losses but with the defense holding, quickly withdrew.  This campaign appeared to heavily wear out both empires and demonstrated the cruel parts of Emperor Taiwu's personality well, as Sima Guang described it in this manner:

Sima Guang further attributed Emperor Wen's military failures to his command style:

As another historian, Shen Yue, pointed out, Emperor Wen modelled his military planning on those of Emperor Guangwu of Han, but lacked Emperor Guangwu's military command abilities, and therefore could not draft proper military plans the way that Emperor Guangwu did. Under Emperor Wen of Song, Zhang Chang helped defeat the Northern Wei invasion of Pengcheng.

In 452, after hearing that Northern Wei's Emperor Taiwu had been assassinated by his eunuch Zong Ai, Emperor Wen prepared another campaign, with his army commanded by Xiao Xihua—but not realizing that his micromanaging had greatly contributed to the failure of the prior campaign, he made the micromanaging even more complete.  After Xiao's assisting general Zhang Yong was defeated at Qiao'ao, however, he abandoned the campaign.

Meanwhile, though, Emperor Wen himself was facing a crisis within his household.  It had been discovered that Crown Prince Shao and another son of Emperor Wen's, Liu Jun the Prince of Shixing (a different son than the Liu Jun referred to above), had secretly retained the witch Yan Daoyu to curse Emperor Wen to death so that Crown Prince Shao could become emperor.  Emperor Wen, while angry, only strongly rebuked his sons and was unwilling to take further punitive actions against them.  By 453, however, Emperor Wen's hopes that his sons had reformed themselves was shattered—as he found evidence that they continued to associate with Yan even after the rebukes.  He therefore discussed with his high-level officials Xu Danzhi, Jiang Dan, and Wang Sengchuo his planned punishment of deposing Crown Prince Shao and ordering Liu Jun to commit suicide.  However, he made the mistakes of discussing the plans with Liu Jun's mother, Consort Pan, and Consort Pan quickly informed Liu Jun, who then informed Crown Prince Shao.  In spring 453, Crown Prince Shao carried out a coup, sending his own guards to secure the palace while sending his close associate Zhang Chaozhi into the palace to assassinate Emperor Wen.  When Zhang entered Emperor Wen's bedchambers with a sword, Emperor Wen's guards were asleep, and Emperor Wen tried to hold a small desk to hold off Zhang's attack.  Zhang's first swing, however, cut off Emperor Wen's fingers, and he then swung again, killing Emperor Wen.  After some confusion, Liu Shao killed Xu and Jiang as well, and then falsely declared that Xu and Jiang had assassinated Emperor Wen; he then took the throne himself, although later that year he was defeated and killed by another brother of his, Liu Jun the Prince of Wuling (different character than the Liu Jun who was Liu Shao's confederate), who took the throne as Emperor Xiaowu.

Liu Shao initially gave his father the posthumous name Emperor Jing with the temple name Zhongzong.  After Emperor Xiaowu took the throne, he changed the posthumous name to Emperor Wen and the temple name to Taizu.

Family
Consorts and Issue:
 Empress Wenyuan, of the Yuan clan of Chen (405–440), personal name Qigui
 Liu Shao, Emperor (424–453), first son
 Princess Dongyangxian, personal name Ying'e
 Married Wang Sengchuo of Langya (423–453), and had issue (Wang Jian)
 Empress Dowager Zhao, of the Lu clan (412–466), personal name Huinan
 Liu Jun, Emperor Xiaowu (430–464), third son
 Empress Dowager Xuan, of the Shen clan (414–453), personal name Rongji
 Liu Yu, Emperor Ming (439–472), 11th son
 Shufei, of the Pan clan (d. 453)
 Liu Jun, Prince Shixing (429–453), second son
 Shuyi, of the Wu clan
 Liu Shuo, Prince Nanpingmu (431–453), fourth son
 Xiuhua, of the Yin clan (d. 459)
 Liu Dan, Prince Jingling (433–459), sixth son
 Xiurong, of the Chen clan
 Liu Hui, Prince Lujiang (436–470), eighth son
 Xiuyi, of the Gao clan
 Liu Shao, Prince Lulingzhao (432–452), fifth son
 Xiuyi, of the Jiang clan
 Liu Hun, Marquis Wuchang (439–455), tenth son
 Xiuyi, of the Yang clan
 Liu Xiuren, Prince Jian'an (443–471), 12th son
 Jieyu, of the Cao clan
 Liu Hong, Prince Jianping Xuanjian (434–458), seventh son
 Ronghua, of the Xie clan
 Liu Chang, Prince Yiyang (436–497), ninth son
 Meiren, of the Jiang clan (d. 446)
 Princess Haiyan, fourth daughter
 Married Zhao Qian
 Meiren, of the Xing clan
 Liu Xiuyou, Prince Jinpingla (445–471), 13th son
 Meiren, of the Cai clan (d. 458)
 Liu Xiumao, Prince Hailing (445–461), 14th son
 Meiren, of the Dong clan
 Liu Xiuye, Prince Poyang'ai (445–456), 15th son
 Meiren, of the Yan clan
 Liu Xiuqian, Prince Linqingchong (446–454), 16th son
 Meiren, of the Chen clan
 Liu Yifu, Prince Xinyehuai (447–452), 17th son
 Meiren, of the Xun clan
 Liu Xiufan, Prince Guiyang (448–474), 18th son
 Meiren, of the Luo clan
 Liu Xiuruo, Prince Baling'ai (448–471), 19th son
 Unknown
 Princess Changcheng, fifth daughter
 Married Xie Wei of Chen, and had issue (Xie Tiao)
 Princess Linchuan, personal name Yingyuan, sixth daughter
 Married Wang Zao of Langya (d. 465)
 Princess Huaiyang, ninth daughter
 Married Jiang Nen of Jiyang, and had issue (one son)
 Princess Xincai, personal name Yingmei, tenth daughter
 Married He Mai of Lujiang (d. 465)
 Married Liu Ziye, Emperor (449–466)
 Princess Nanyang, 15th daughter
 Married Xu Hengzhi of Donghai, Marquis Zhijiang
 Princess Langyazhen, sixth daughter
 Married Chu Ai of Henan, and had issue (one son)
 Princess Nanxian, 16th daughter
 Married Meng Shao
 Married Chu Yuan of Henan (435–482)
 Princess Xunyang
 Married Xi Ye of Gaoping, and had issue (one son, one daughter)
 Princess Lujiang
 Married Chu Cheng of Henan (d. 483), and had issue (Lady Chu Lingqu)

Ancestry

References

 Book of Song, vol. 5.
 History of Southern Dynasties, vol. 2.
 Zizhi Tongjian, vols. 118, 119, 120, 121, 122, 123, 124, 125, 126, 127.

407 births
453 deaths
Jin dynasty (266–420) people
Liu Song emperors
People from Zhenjiang
Murdered Chinese emperors